Menegazzia asahinae is a species of foliose lichen from Japan.

See also
List of Menegazzia species

References

asahinae
Lichen species
Lichens of Japan
Lichens described in 1943
Taxa named by Yasuhiko Asahina